Kevin Lotscher (born February 17, 1988) is a Swiss former professional ice hockey player who last played for EHC Biel in Switzerland's National League A.

He is participating at the 2011 IIHF World Championship as a member of the Switzerland men's national ice hockey team.

In the early hours of May 14, 2011, Kevin Lotscher was involved in a traffic accident in the Swiss town of Sierre, and suffered life-threatening head injuries. Police have reported that Lotscher was walking on the side of the road around 4:30 a.m. when he was hit head-on by a drunk driver. The driver of the car, a 19-year-old woman, tested positive for alcohol and was detained by police. This would eventually end his professional hockey career.

References

External links

1988 births
EHC Biel players
Living people
Swiss ice hockey forwards